Sailolof (also known as Kampung Sailolof) is a small port town in Southwest Papua, Indonesia, some 1686 miles from Jakarta. Sailolof also constitutes a historic kingdom one of the Four Kings of Raja Ampat Islands in Southwest Papua. The town is located near the western coastal tip of the Bird's Head Peninsula.

References

Populated places in Raja Ampat